FAT atypical cadherin 3 is a protein that in humans is encoded by the FAT3 gene.

References

Further reading